Duke Nukem: Zero Hour is a third-person shooter video game in the Duke Nukem series, developed by Eurocom for the Nintendo 64. The game uses a relatively large 32 megabyte cartridge and can also use the Expansion Pak to allow for better graphics but slowing down the frame rate. It has a 4 player split-screen multiplayer mode that uses a first-person view.

The plot revolves around time travelling aliens attempting to alter the course of history and eliminate Duke's ancestors.  Locations, weapons, items, and clothing are relevant to the time period Duke is in. Compared to the comically over-the-top thematic tone used throughout most of the series, this game noticeably features much more mature plot elements, such as an encounter with Jack the Ripper near the still-fresh murder scene of Mary Jane Kelly in Victorian England and a rather serious depiction of a future New York devastated by atomic warfare.

Plot
Duke is called into action via the Government, aliens have once again landed and are wreaking havoc. Duke pummels the alien menace through the streets of New York with the help of some Marines, and eventually gains access to the Statue of Liberty. Here, Duke discovers the aliens' true plan, to go back in time and mess with historic events so Earth now wouldn't be what it is and make it so they could easily take over. However, Duke in his fight is teleported to the future, where the aliens have won and the humans are near extinction. In this time zone, Duke battles through horrors of new alien breeds in the future, and the zombified corpses of those who didn't survive the fallout. Duke eventually meets up with the small band of resistance fighters in the old headquarters of the U.S. army in New York. There, they tell him that the aliens are indeed screwing with history, so much that this future is just one; if Duke wants the old one back he'll have to fight for it. The humans have developed their own time machine in order to send a soldier back to re-write history, and destroy the aliens. Duke is sent back to the Old West, where aliens have taken over parts of the American West in an effort to detonate a bomb in Earth's core to destroy the planet.

In the Old West, due to technical difficulties, Duke must make do with period weaponry with the exception of a few of his weapons which his allies can send back. The aliens have begun creating super-soldiers in order to combat Nukem and the humans of the future. After blowing up a ship containing the super-soldiers, Duke makes his way to the town of Roswell. There, he stops the bomb before the aliens can succeed. Duke then is informed, that it's not just America's past that is being altered, the aliens have also been sent to the Victorian Era of London.

In the Victorian Era, Duke is set upon by the biological weaponry the aliens have been manufacturing. Zombies litter the streets, and Brains float in the air. Duke fights toward the castle, which the aliens have taken over (not before blowing up a Zeppelin). In the castle, Duke faces the worst of the horrors the aliens have created, and finally confronts the alien general in charge of it all, a giant brain. After demolishing the castle, and eliminating the alien threat in time, Duke is ready for some R'n'R, unfortunately, the aliens aren't. All of the meddling with time has caused a rift in the space-time continuum, and now more aliens from all of history are pouring into New York in a desperate attempt to destroy humanity.

Once again fighting through the city streets, Duke enters the alien mothership. He fights through wave after wave of aliens in order to confront the monster behind all this madness, Zero. Duke uses the alien technology from the mother ship and battles Zero on the rooftops of the city. After felling the beast, Duke finally sets things right. Duke cleans up Manhattan from the alien menace, and gets ready to relax with his "reward".

Reception

Zero Hour received "average" reviews according to the review aggregation website GameRankings. Nintendo Power gave it a favorable review over a month before the game was released Stateside. Jeff Lundrigan of Next Generation said that the game should be avoided "like radioactive bat droppings."

References

External links
Duke Nukem Zero Hour at Eurocom

1999 video games
Zero Hour
Nintendo 64 games
Nintendo 64-only games
Third-person shooters
Video games about time travel
Video games about Jack the Ripper
Video games developed in the United Kingdom
Video games set in London
Video games set in New Mexico
Video games set in New York City
Video games set in the United States
RMS Titanic in video games
Split-screen multiplayer games
GT Interactive games
Eurocom games
3D Realms games
Multiplayer and single-player video games